Hassan Mohammed (born 20 January 1980) is a Malaysian cricketer. He played in the 2014 ICC World Cricket League Division Five tournament.

References

External links
 

1980 births
Living people
Malaysian cricketers
Place of birth missing (living people)